Simon Hayes may refer to: 

Simon Hayes (police commissioner), politician
Simon Hayes (sound engineer)

See also
Simon Haynes, Australian writer
Simon Haynes (priest)
Simon Hay, British epidemiologist